Cappelletti may refer to:

People
Ángel Cappelletti (1927–1995), Argentine professor
Daniel Cappelletti (born 1991), Italian footballer
Felice Cappelletti (1656–1738), Italian painter
Gino Cappelletti (1934–2022), American football player
Giuseppe Cappelletti, 19th-century scholar of Armenia and Venice including the Doge's Palace
Joe Cappelletti (born 1966), voice actor
John Cappelletti (born 1952), American football running back
Mike Cappelletti (1942–2013), American bridge player and poker authority

Other uses
Cappelletti convention, a bidding convention in contract bridge
Cappelletti (distillery), a liqueur manufacturer
Cappelletti or stratioti, Albanian mercenaries in 15th- to 18th-century Venice
Cappelletti (pasta), a type of pasta similar to tortellini

Italian-language surnames